The Alois Kottmann Award is an international prize for "classical, cantando violin playing". It honours outstanding international violinists. The competition takes place annually in May and/or June during International Days of Music Hesse Main-Taunus Hofheim in Hofheim am Taunus, Hesse, Germany.

History 

The Alois Kottmann Award was founded and donated in 2001. It is named after its founder and benefactor, the German violinist and university professor Alois Kottmann.

During the first years of the competition, only one participant received an award and special prizes were offered to honour further special talents or performances. This changed in 2005 when two participants received awards. In the years 2006 and 2007, special appreciation awards were introduced along the main award and the special prizes. In addition, the unparalleled "Bach Award of the city of Hofheim am Taunus" was presented in 2007 to Sabrina-Vivian Höpcker (Germany). In 2010, first and second places of the Alois Kottmann Award were created, along with the special prizes. In addition, the title "Laudatory Appreciation" was introduced.

Aim 
The award is meant to aid and encourage the Frankfurt-based tradition of Carl Flesch which has its most prominent exponents in Alma Moodie and Max Rostal. The jury will place special emphasis on classical discipline, on an artistic and stylistic understanding of the performed works as well as a singing (cantando) style which signifies and characterises the personality of the artist.

"Outstanding violinists can be recognized by their tone, but with the young ones this is often not possible anymore. What is heard from them is performed speciously but without personality. The violin was created because man is able to sing also with it."Professor h. c. Alois Kottmann (translated from German)

Conditions 
The award consists of 3,000 euro, a silver medal and a certificate. In addition, one or more special prizes will be awarded if applicable.

The competition is open for violinists internationally. There is no age restriction. During the competition musical pieces are required to be performed which are published one year in advance and will change annually. Memorised play is not required nor specially rated. Closing date for applications is in April.

The members of the judging panel are Margit Neubauer (singer), university professor Alois Kottmann (violin, benefactor and patron of the award), and Boris Kottmann (violin).

Recipients

References

External links 
 Pictures of Awardees, Founder/Benefactor etc. (German)

German music awards
Classical music awards
Music competitions in Germany
Awards established in 2001
Classical music in Germany
Culture in Frankfurt